The Panorama Hills are a mountain range in the interior California Coast Ranges, in eastern San Luis Obispo County, California.

References 

California Coast Ranges
Mountain ranges of San Luis Obispo County, California